Randy W. Shumway (born November 24, 1971) is the founder and CEO of Cicero Group. In 2017, he was recognized as CEO of the Year in Utah and received a Lifetime Achievement award from Utah Business. In 2019, Shumway was appointed to the University of Utah Board of Trustees and in 2021 was appointed to the Utah Homelessness Council. Shumway serves on multiple philanthropic as well as corporate boards.

Education
Shumway obtained his MBA from Harvard Business School, where he graduated in the top 5% of his class.

Business career 
Shumway worked for Bain & Company as a Senior Associate prior to attending Harvard University.

From 2010 to 2018 Shumway was the Economic Advisor to Zions Bank From 2012 to 2019 he was an adjunct professor at University of Utah's David Eccles School of Business. He has also served on the board of the Utah Economic Council and the Utah Education Excellence Commission. Shumway was elected to a four-year term (2002–2006) on the Governing Board of the Dublin Unified School District in Alameda County, California.

In early 2001, Shumway started Cicero Group, a data-driven strategy firm. Cicero Group is headquartered in Salt Lake City, Utah, with additional offices in Dallas, Texas, and Washington D.C. The firm has been recognized with such awards as:

“No. 43 Fastest Growing Firms” in North America 2018 by Consulting magazine

“Top 50 Consulting Firms” in North America 2018 by Vault.com

 No. 4 overall consulting firm for internal mobility
 No. 5 overall for supervisor mentorship
 No. 12 boutique consulting firm
 No. 40 overall consulting firm

Utah “Best of State” award

 Eight consecutive awards since 2012

Utah Department of Workforce Services Best Places to Work

MountainWest 100

Fast50

Personal life 
Shumway is married to the former Maureen Ryder, a pediatric nurse practitioner. They are the parents of five. Their oldest son, Ian, joined their family as a foster son in 2000 when he was 14 years old and was later adopted.

Shumway writes for the Deseret News and Forbes on business and economic issues.

Chronic homelessness has been an important social issue and area of local outreach for Shumway and Cicero Group. Recent articles that explore this work include:

 "Why a Utah consulting firm wanted to be closer to Salt Lake's homeless shelter, soup kitchen" via Deseret News.
 "Finding Common Ground: An analytical approach to ending chronic homelessness" via Harvard Business School Alumni Association.

References 

American chief executives
Harvard Business School alumni
University of Utah faculty
1971 births
Living people